Cross Link is a proposed fixed link which would connect the municipalities of Øygarden, northern Askøy, and Alver in Vestland county, Norway. The road is planned to give better transport within Nordhordland and from there to Askøy and Øygarden.

Specifically, the proposal includes a ferry from the Kollsnes area of Øygarden to somewhere south of the island of Herdla in Askøy, a subsea road tunnel from the same area on the island of Holsnøy, and road across the island and then a new subsea section across to Radøy. Although not in any public proposals, there have been private proposals to develop Mjølkevikvarden in Askøy as a site for a new port for Bergen. This would only be possible if the Cross Link was built. Mongstad is one of several proposed locations for the new port, and the Cross Link would make it a more central location. The Cross Link would allow a small amount of traffic to bypass the main road system in central Bergen and would allow much faster transport between two large industrial sites, Kollsnes and Mongstad. A toll company has been established by the involved municipalities, although politicians from Nordhordland have stated that their top priority is to build the Nyborg Tunnel, which will reduce travel time towards Bergen, and a road package which involves upgrading part of the county road network in the area.

References

External links
 Official site

Proposed tunnels in Norway
Road tunnels in Vestland
Subsea tunnels in Norway
Øygarden
Askøy
Alver (municipality)